Mydromera notochloris is a moth of the subfamily Arctiinae. It was described by Jean Baptiste Boisduval in 1870. It is found in Costa Rica, Guatemala, Honduras, Nicaragua and Colombia.

References

External links
 Encyclopedia of Life

Arctiinae
Moths described in 1870